Jack Wiseman (1919 in Brierfield, Lancashire – 1991) was a British economist. He is known for being one of the first professors of economics at the University of York and an early scholar of health economics.

He joined the Territorial Army in 1939 and fought in the Second World War. Wiseman joined the London School of Economics as a student in 1946, where he later became a lecturer in business and public finance. In 1964, Wiseman joined the University of York, where he was founding director of the Institute of Social and Economic Research.

Selected publications 
 The Growth of Public Expenditure in the United Kingdom. (with Alan T. Peacock) George Allen & Unwin, 1961
 Cost, Choice and Political Economy. Edward Elgar Publishing Ltd, 1989

References 

1919 births
1991 deaths
British economists
Academics of the University of York